Gentry County is a county located in the northwestern portion of the U.S. state of Missouri. As of the 2020 census, the population was 6,162. Its county seat is Albany. The county was organized February 14, 1841 and named for Colonel Richard Gentry of Boone County, who fell in the Seminole War in 1837.

Geography

Adjacent counties
Worth County (north)
Harrison County (east)
Daviess County (southeast)
DeKalb County (south)
Andrew County (southwest)
Nodaway County (west)

Major highways
 U.S. Route 136
 U.S. Route 169

 Route 85

Demographics

As of the census of 2010, there were 6,738 people, 2,674 households, and 1,789 families residing in the county.  The population density was 14 people per square mile (5/km2).  There were 3,209 housing units at an average density of 6 per square mile (3/km2).  The racial makeup of the county was 98.38% White, 0.31% Black or African American, 0.27% Asian, 0.19% Native American, 0.16% from other races, and 0.68% from two or more races.  0.53% of the population were Hispanic or Latino of any race.

There were 2,674 households, of which 29.06% had children under the age of 18 living with them, 55.42% were married couples living together, 8.23% had a female householder with no husband present, and 33.10% were non-families. 29.02% of all households were made up of individuals, and 15.07% had someone living alone who was 65 years of age or older.  The average household size was 2.45 and the average family size was 3.03.

In the county, the population was spread out, with 24.55% under the age of 18, 7.85% from 18 to 24, 20.67% from 25 to 44, 26.43% from 45 to 64, and 20.50% who were 65 years of age or older.  The median age was 42.4 years. For every 100 females there were 93.62 males.  For every 100 females age 18 and over, there were 92.43 males.

The median income for a household in the county was $35,556, and the median income for a family was $46,458. Males had a median income of $33,558 versus $25,815 for females. The per capita income for the county was $19,021.  About 9.30% of families and 14.90% of the population were below the poverty line, including 24.40% of those under age 18 and 15.00% of those age 65 or over.

Religion
According to the Association of Religion Data Archives County Membership Report (2010), Gentry County is sometimes regarded as being on the northern edge of the Bible Belt, with evangelical Protestantism being the most predominant religion. The most predominant denominations among residents in Gentry County who adhere to a religion are Southern Baptists (46.29%), United Methodists (18.20%), and Disciples of Christ (13.12%).

2020 Census

Education

Public schools
Albany R-III School District – Albany
Virginia E. George Elementary School (PK-05)
Albany Middle School (06-08)
Albany High School (09-12)
King City R-I School District – King City
King City Elementary School (PK-06)
King City High School (07-12)
Stanberry R-II School District – Stanberry
Stanberry Elementary School (K-06)
Stanberry High School (07-12)

Public libraries
Albany Carnegie Public Library  
Gentry County Library

Politics

Local
Political control is divided at the local level in Gentry County. Republicans hold a slim majority of the elected positions in the county.

State

Gentry County is part of the 2nd district in the Missouri House of Representatives, currently held by J. Eggleston (R-Maysville).

Gentry County is a part of Missouri's 12th District in the Missouri Senate and is currently represented by Dan Hegeman (R-Cosby).

Federal
All of Gentry County is included in Missouri's 6th Congressional District and is currently represented by Sam Graves (R-Tarkio) in the U.S. House of Representatives. Graves was elected to an eleventh term in 2020 over Democratic challenger Gena Ross.

Gentry County, along with the rest of the state of Missouri, is represented in the U.S. Senate by Josh Hawley (R-Columbia) and Roy Blunt (R-Strafford).

Political culture

At the presidential level, Gentry County is solidly Republican. Donald Trump carried the county easily in  2016 and 2020. Bill Clinton was the last Democratic presidential nominee to carry Gentry County in 1996, and no Democrat has won majority support from Gentry County voters since Michael Dukakis in 1988.

Like most rural areas throughout northwest Missouri, voters in Gentry County generally adhere to socially and culturally conservative principles which tend to influence their Republican leanings. In 2004, Missourians voted on a constitutional amendment to define marriage as the union between a man and a woman—it overwhelmingly won in Gentry County with 79.9% of the vote. The initiative passed the state with 71% support from voters. In 2006, Missourians voted on a constitutional amendment to fund and legalize embryonic stem cell research in the state—it failed in Gentry County with 58.3% voting against the measure. The initiative narrowly passed the state with 51% of support from voters as Missouri became one of the first states in the nation to approve embryonic stem cell research. Despite Gentry County's longstanding tradition of supporting socially conservative platforms, voters in the county have a penchant for advancing populist causes like increasing the minimum wage. In 2006, Missourians voted on a proposition (Proposition B) to increase the minimum wage in the state to $6.50 an hour—it passed Gentry County with 63.3% of the vote. The proposition strongly passed every single county in Missouri with 78.99% voting in favor. (During the same election, voters in five other states also strongly approved increases in the minimum wage.) In 2018, Missourians voted on a proposition (Proposition A) concerning right to work, the outcome of which ultimately reversed the right to work legislation passed in the state the previous year. 61.82% of Gentry County voters cast their ballots to overturn the law.

Missouri presidential preference primaries

2020
The 2020 presidential primaries for both the Democratic and Republican parties were held in Missouri on March 10. On the Democratic side, former Vice President Joe Biden (D-Delaware) both won statewide and carried Gentry County by a wide margin. He went on to defeat President Donald Trump in the general election.

Incumbent President Donald Trump (R-Florida) faced only nominal opposition in the primary and won both Gentry County and statewide by large margins.

2016
The 2016 presidential primaries for both the Republican and Democratic parties were held in Missouri on March 15. Businessman Donald Trump (R-New York) narrowly won the state overall and carried a plurality of the vote in Gentry County. He went on to win the presidency.

On the Democratic side, former Secretary of State Hillary Clinton (D-New York) both won statewide by a small margin but narrowly lost Gentry County to Senator Bernie Sanders (I-Vermont).

2012
The 2012 Missouri Republican Presidential Primary's results were nonbinding on the state's national convention delegates. Voters in Gentry County supported former U.S. Senator Rick Santorum (R-Pennsylvania), who finished first in the state at large, but eventually lost the nomination to former Governor Mitt Romney (R-Massachusetts). Delegates to the congressional district and state conventions were chosen at a county caucus, which selected a delegation favoring Santorum. Incumbent President Barack Obama easily won the Missouri Democratic Primary and renomination. He defeated Romney in the general election.

2008
In 2008, the Missouri Republican Presidential Primary was closely contested, with Senator John McCain (R-Arizona) prevailing and eventually winning the nomination.

Then-Senator Hillary Clinton (D-New York) received more votes than any candidate from either party in Gentry County during the 2008 presidential primary. Despite initial reports that Clinton had won Missouri, Barack Obama (D-Illinois), also a Senator at the time, narrowly defeated her statewide and later became that year's Democratic nominee, going on to win the presidency.

Communities

Cities
Albany (county seat)
King City
McFall
Stanberry

Villages
Darlington
Gentry

Unincorporated Communities

 Alanthus Grove
 Enyart
 Evona
 Ford City
 Gentryville
 Island City
 Lone Star
 McCurry
 Mount Pleasant
 Siloam Springs

Miscellaneous
On March 5, 2010, a jury awarded seven neighboring farmers $11 million in damages from Premium Standard Farms over odors emanating from a hog farm of  that processes 200,000 hogs near Berlin in Gentry County - the largest such award in history.

See also
National Register of Historic Places listings in Gentry County, Missouri

References

External links
Gentry County Library
 Digitized 1930 Plat Book of Gentry County  from University of Missouri Division of Special Collections, Archives, and Rare Books

 
Missouri counties
1841 establishments in Missouri
Populated places established in 1841